The 1882 presidential election of Costa Rica in 1882 was the first after a long line of successive de facto governments following the coup against Aniceto Esquivel Sáenz by his former ally Tomás Guardia Gutiérrez. Vicente Herrera Zeledón, Costa Rica's first conservative president, was placed in Esquivel's place, but in practice he was a puppet of Guardia's authoritarian regime. After the brief presidency of Herrera who resigned using health reasons as excuse, the political elite appoints Guardia to replace him. However Guardia died in 1882 and elections were called, which were won by Freemason and liberal Próspero Fernández Oreamuno member of the Olympus Generation, an elite group of liberal intellectuals nicknamed as such due to their arrogance. 

Fernández Oreamuno died in office on March 12, 1885, being replaced by the vice president and fellow Olympus member Bernardo Soto Alfaro, for the rest of his term.

Results
Second grade electors

References

Elections in Costa Rica
1882 elections in Central America
Single-candidate elections
1882 in Costa Rica